Forbes is a surname. It derives from the Scottish Clan Forbes (after a toponym, from Gaelic forba "field"). Descendants of the Scottish clan have also been present in Ireland since the 17th century. The name of an unrelated Irish sept, Mac Fhirbhisigh or MacFirbis, was also anglicised as Forbes. 

Notable people with the surname Forbes include:

Aristocracy

 Clan Forbes, descendants of Alexander de Forbes, 1st Lord Forbes (c. 1380–1448): see Lord Forbes, Lord Forbes of Pitsligo.
 Nigel Forbes, 22nd Lord Forbes (1918–2013), Scottish soldier, businessman and politician
 Forbes baronets of the Baronetage of Nova Scotia: four distinct baronetcies for people called Forbes:
 Forbes, later Stuart-Forbes, of Monymusk, created 1626 for William Forbes  (died c.  1650)
 Sir William Forbes, 6th Baronet (1739–1806)
 Forbes, of Castle Forbes, created 1628 for Arthur Forbes (1590–1632): see Earl of Granard.
 Forbes, of Craigievar, created 1630 for William Forbes (died 1648).
 Sir Ewan Forbes, 11th Baronet (1912–1991)
 Forbes of Foveran, created 1700 for Samuel Forbes (c. 1663 – 1717), extinct with the death of the 3rd baronet, John Forbes, c. 1760.
 Forbes baronets of Newe in the County of Aberdeen, created 1823 for Charles Forbes (1774–1849).
 Hamish Forbes, 7th Baronet (1916–2007)

Artists

 Edwin Forbes (1839–1895), American landscape painter, etcher, and war artist during the American Civil War
 Elizabeth Forbes (artist) (1859–1912), Canadian artist
 Stanhope Forbes (1857–1947), Irish painter

Business people

 Forbes family, a wealthy extended Canadian/American Family descended from John Forbes (1740–1783), an Anglican clergyman of Strathdon, Aberdeenshire, recorded in Milton, Massachusetts, by 1769.
 James Grant Forbes (1879–1955), American businessman
 Robert Pierce Forbes (born 1958), American historian
 William Cameron Forbes (1870–1959), American investment banker and diplomat, Governor-General of the Philippines (1908–13), US Ambassador to Japan (1930–32)
 George Forbes (businessman) (born 1945), businessman
 James Staats Forbes (1823–1904) Scottish railway engineer, administrator, businessman and art collector
 John Murray Forbes (1813–1898), American businessman and philanthropist
 Walter Forbes, American executive and convicted fraudster

Musicians

 China Forbes (born 1970), American singer and songwriter
 Derek Forbes (born 1956), Scottish singer and musician
 Elizabeth Forbes (musicologist) (1924–2014), critic and musicologist
 Elliot Forbes (1917–2006), conductor and musicologist
 Kiernan Forbes (born 1988), South African hip hop musician
 Watson Forbes (1909-1997) Scottish musician, viola specialist

Performers and affiliated professions

 Brenda Forbes (1909–1996), British-born American actress
 Bryan Forbes (1926–2013), English film director, actor and writer
 Mary Forbes (1883–1974), British-American actress
 Maya Forbes (born 1968), American producer and director
 Michelle Forbes (born 1965), American actress
 Ralph Forbes (1904–1952), English actor

Politicians

 Archie Forbes (1913–1999), Permanent Secretary of the Ministry of Agriculture & Cooperative Development in Tanganyika (1960–1963)
 Frederick Augustus Forbes (1818–1878), Australian politician
 George Forbes (New Zealand politician) (1869–1947), Prime Minister of New Zealand from 1930 to 1935
 George L. Forbes (born 1931), American politician
 Jim Forbes (Australian politician) (1923–2019), Australian soldier and politician
 John Murray Forbes (diplomat) (1771–1831), American diplomat
 Kate Forbes (born 1990), Scottish politician who is currently the Scottish Cabinet Secretary for Finance and the Economy
 Michael Forbes (born 1952), American politician
 Muriel Forbes (1894–1991), British politician
 Peter W. Forbes (born 1850), Canadian-born member of the California legislature
 Randy Forbes (born 1952), American politician in US House of Representatives
 William Henry Forbes (1815–1875), American territorial legislator

Publishers

 Forbes family (publishers)
 B. C. Forbes (1880–1954), founder of Forbes magazine
 Christopher Forbes, Vice-Chairman of the Forbes Publishing Company
 Malcolm Forbes (1919–1990), publisher of Forbes magazine, son of B. C.
 Steve Forbes (born 1947), American businessman, current publisher of Forbes Magazine
 Tim Forbes, brother of Steve, also worked for the company

Scientists

 David McHattie Forbes (1863–1937), Scottish botanist and ethnologist in Hawai'i
 Edward Forbes (1815–1854), British naturalist
 Fayette F. Forbes (1851-1935), was a water engineer, plant collector, and botanist.
 Francis Blackwell Forbes (1839–1908), American merchant and botanist in China
 George Forbes (scientist) (1849–1936), scientist
 Gregory S. Forbes (born 1950), American meteorologist
 Henry Ogg Forbes (1851–1932), British ornithologist, botanist and museum director
 James David Forbes (1809–1868), Scottish physicist and glaciologist
 John Forbes, (1798-1823), English botanist
 John J. Forbes (1885–1975), American mining engineer
 Stephen Alfred Forbes (1844–1930), American entomologist and ecologist
 William Alexander Forbes (1855–1883), British zoologist
 William Trowbridge Merrifield Forbes (1885–1968), American entomologist
 John Forbes Nash Jr. (1928–2015), American mathematician; Economic Science's Nobel Prize awarded in 1994

Sportspeople
 Alex Forbes (1925–2014), retired Scottish footballer
 Bryn Forbes (born 1993), American basketball player
 Drew Forbes (born 1997), American football player
 Elizabeth Forbes (athlete) (1910–2002), New Zealand track and field athlete
 Emmanuel Forbes (born 2001), American football player
 Fred Forbes (born 1894), Scottish footballer
 Gary Forbes (born 1985), Panamanian/American basketball player
 Gordon Forbes (1934–2020), South African tennis player
 Harry Forbes (boxer) (1879–1946), American boxer
 Harry Forbes (rugby league), rugby player
 Ross Forbes (born 1989), Scottish footballer who plays for Motherwell
 Terrell Forbes (born 1981), British footballer
 W. J. Forbes (1874–1900), American college sports coach

Writers

 Archibald Forbes (1838–1900), British war correspondent
 Colin Forbes (novelist), pseudonym of British novelist Raymond Harold Sawkins
 Edith Willis Linn Forbes (1865–1945), American poet and writer
 Esther Forbes (1891–1967), American novelist and children's writer
 Lani Forbes (1987–2022), American author of young adult fantasy novels
 Mihingarangi Forbes, New Zealand journalist, presenter and radio broadcaster
 Moira Forbes (born 1979), American journalist

Others
 James Forbes (1749–1819), British traveller and artist
 James A. Forbes, American clergyman
 John Forbes (British Army officer) (1707–1759), British general in the French and Indian War
 Sir John Forbes (1925–2021), British admiral
 Kristin Forbes (born 1970), American economist
 Norman Hay Forbes (1863–1916), British doctor and academic
 Rosemary Forbes Kerry (1913–2002), American activist and mother of John Kerry

Given name
Forbes as a given name is rare, mostly known due to Forbes Burnham (full name Linden Forbes Sampson Burnham , 1923–1985), leader of Guyana from 1964 until his death.

Forbes McAllister is a fictional character (a "cynical restaurant critic") from Knowing Me, Knowing You... with Alan Partridge (1994).

References

 

Scottish surnames
Surnames of Irish origin
English-language surnames